Spindizzy may refer to:
 Spin Dizzie, a Star Trek fanzine.
 Spindizzy, a fictional starship propulsion system.
 SS Spindizzy, a KK-drive starship in several Alan Dean Foster sci-fi novels.
 Spindizzy (video game), a puzzle-based video game for various 8-bit systems.
 Spindizzy Worlds, a puzzle-based video game for the Amiga, Atari ST, NEC PC-9801, Sharp X68000 and SNES.
 Spindizzy, a thrill ride at Diggerland.
 Spindizzy, a type of Tether car.
 Spindizzy, a record label.